= The Secret World of Nature: Spain =

2013 Spanish nature documentary

Tierra y agua (known internationally in English as The Secret World of Nature: Spain) is a Spanish nature documentary television series, originally released in 2013. The production was re-released and distributed in English in 2020 through international platforms. It is produced by brothers Pedro and Gerardo Poveda, who also serve as director, screenwriter, and cinematographer.

== Synopsis ==
The series explores the biodiversity, wildlife and natural landscapes of the Iberian Peninsula throughout its episodes, documenting the survival of different animal species in the Spanish environment.

== Production and distribution ==
The audiovisual project began its commercial journey and international distribution in 2013. The production stands out for its use of Dolby Surround sound technologies for the natural ambiance of the recorded ecosystems and the wide biodiversity shown.

Internationally, the series is distributed by Janson Media and is available on global streaming platforms such as Amazon Prime Video, and Tubi reaching audiences in Spanish- and English-speaking markets such as Spain, the United States, Canada, Mexico, the United Kingdom, and Australia. The series consists of one season of five episodes, with each episode lasting approximately 25 minutes.

== Awards ==
- Telenatura International Festival (2012): The production was awarded a film prize at the 11th edition of the International Television Festival for the Conservation and Dissemination of Nature (Telenatura), organized by the University of Navarra.
